...Only for Freaks! is the second album by the Spanish punk band The Killer Barbies. It was released in 1996 by Toxic Records/Subterfuge Records and was produced by Billy D. and Javier Abreu.

Track listing 
 "Freak Show" (4.18)
 "Chainsaw Times" (2.25)
 "Chinatown" (2.34)
 "The Phone" (3.40)
 "Traci Lords" (1.30)
 "Pinball" (1.59)
 "Train from Kansas City" (3.33)
 "No Waves! (2.18)
 "Friday 13th" (2.35)
 "Be Your Girl" (4.07)
 "They Come From Mars" (2.18)
 "I Don't Mind" (1.43)
 "Bad Trip Experience?" (1.19)

External links 
 Entry for the album in the official discography of the band
 Review and description of the release 

The Killer Barbies albums
1996 albums